Alien Odyssey is an action-adventure game developed by Argonaut Software and published by Philips Media in 1995.

Gameplay
Alien Odyssey blends together several game genres, and includes shooting-based action scenes alongside puzzle-centric adventure sequences.

Plot
The player assumes the role of protagonist Psaph, who faces off against the Dak, a race of cyborg aliens.

Reception

Reviewing Alien Odyssey for PC Gamer US, Brett Jones called it a scattered and unfocused title that "would be a winner if it stuck with one style." PC Entertainments Bill Meyer was more positive, arguing that the game "should be one of the real sleepers of 1996" because of its quality. Computer Game Review recommended the title to fans of Cyberia.

References

External links

1995 video games
Action-adventure games
DOS games
DOS-only games
Science fiction video games
Video games about extraterrestrial life
Video games developed in the United Kingdom
Argonaut Games games
Single-player video games